Owl Creek is a stream in Ralls County in the U.S. state of Missouri. It is a tributary of Sugar Creek.

Owl Creek was so named on account of owls in the area.

See also
List of rivers of Missouri

References

Rivers of Ralls County, Missouri
Rivers of Missouri